Pawłowice is a palace belonging to the Mielzynski family, members of the Polish nobility. It is located in Pawłowice village.

Palaces in Poland
Leszno County
Buildings and structures in Greater Poland Voivodeship